The 1998–99 season was the eighth time Tennis Borussia Berlin played in the 2. Fußball-Bundesliga, the second highest tier of the German football league system. After 34 league games, Tennis Borussia finished 6th. The club had a long run in the DFB-Pokal; making it to the quarter-finals where they lost 2–1 after extra time away to SV Werder Bremen. Ilija Aračić scored eight of the club's 47 league goals before his mid-season move to local rivals Hertha BSC.

1998–99 Tennis Borussia Berlin squad

1998–99 fixtures

Player statistics

Final league position – 6th

References

External links 
 1998–99 Tennis Borussia Berlin season – squad and statistics at fussballdaten.de 

Tennis Borussia Berlin seasons
Tennis Borussia Berlin